The thirteenth season of Law & Order: Special Victims Unit debuted on NBC on September 21, 2011, and concluded on May 23, 2012. With Law & Order: LA and Law & Order: Criminal Intent having ended in July 2011 and June 2011 respectively, this season of Law & Order: SVU was the first to be broadcast without any other running U.S. Law & Order series, a position the series has held until the nineteenth season, when Law & Order True Crime premiered.

Season 13 dealt with the departure of Detective Elliot Stabler (Christopher Meloni) from the Special Victims Unit after a shooting in the squad room. Additionally, Warren Leight, coming over from the recently concluded Law & Order: Criminal Intent, became the executive producer/showrunner for the series replacing Neal Baer who began working on a CBS medical drama.

Production 
Warren Leight replaced Neal Baer as showrunner, after Baer moved to CBS Television Studios. NBC executive Robert Greenblatt said the network planned to "reset the tone" of the show but have the storylines "still be compelling but a little more grounded". Filming began in July 2011 and the first three episodes were finished mid-August. Production resumed on the rest of the season after Labor Day (September 5, 2011). Casting director Jonathan Strauss also took on the job of co-producer on the show; his promotion was described as a rare move in the television industry. Strauss told The Hollywood Reporter, "NBCUniversal and Wolf Films have afforded me this unique opportunity, and in television, a fairly unprecedented one, to serve as both casting director and co-producer on SVU."

The thirteenth season was Ted Kotcheff's last year serving as an executive producer for the series. He stated in an interview that the departures of Christopher Meloni and Neal Baer were the primary factors in his decision to leave as well. He also thought that a large turnover in the writing and producing staff would help the show stay fresh saying "Listen, twelve and a half years. That is enough. Let this new writer you have coming in have a blank page so that he can maybe recreate the show, and bring something new to it."

Cast changes and returning characters
On May 14, 2011, TVLine reported that Mariska Hargitay would return for a thirteenth season, while Christopher Meloni had not come to terms with his contract yet. Initial reports indicated that she would appear in only the first 13 episodes, and then her character would be promoted to a supervisor position with a new detective replacing her; however, NBC chairman Bob Greenblatt clarified later that August that she would be in every episode of the season. NBC was considering Jennifer Love Hewitt to replace Hargitay. Greenblatt later told TVLine, "Jennifer Love is somebody we've been circling, but I don't know that that is going to happen at all". It was later reported that Jennifer Love Hewitt would not be coming to the show.

Mariska Hargitay said that "He inspired me every day with his integrity, his extraordinary talent and his commitment to the truth. I love him deeply and will miss him terribly — I'm so excited to see what he'll do next." On August 1, 2011, Greenblatt confirmed that Meloni's character would not be killed off.
On June 10, 2011, co-star Ice-T renewed his contract for two more seasons (seasons 13 and 14). Kate Ward of Entertainment Weekly felt co-star Ice-T should have replaced Meloni, instead of searching for a new cast member. Actors Danny Pino, Kevin Alejandro, David Conrad, Michael Raymond-James, and later Rhys Coiro were tested June 21, opposite Hargitay as replacements for Meloni. NBC and creator Dick Wolf aimed for a younger female and male actor as they tried to extend the series' lifespan by several more years.  On June 27, 2011, NBC announced that Kelli Giddish and Danny Pino would be brought on as the new series regulars.

Stephanie March and Diane Neal returned to SVU in their roles as Assistant District Attorneys Alexandra Cabot and Casey Novak respectively for "an undetermined number of episodes". Neal told TV Guide, "It's back on track to what the original SVU was intended to be, which is about sex crimes and crimes against children, it's got more of a nitty-gritty feel." She says having her and Stephanie March back provides a familiarity for viewers now that original cast member Chris Meloni is gone. "I think they should put us in the court room together!" she says about March.

On July 17, 2011, during an SVU marathon on USA Network dedicated to his character, BD Wong announced his departure from the cast on Twitter. In response to a tweet about his character's status in season 13, he wrote, "I actually do not return for Season 13, I am jumping to Awake. It's awesome!". Wong added, "I don't know if or when I'll be back [on SVU]! It was amazing to have such a cool job for 11 years and to be a real NY Actor." Wong reprised his role in the episode "Father Dearest", which aired on May 2, 2012.

Tamara Tunie was moved from the main cast credits to a "special guest" starring role.

Cast

Main cast
 Mariska Hargitay as Senior Detective Olivia Benson
 Danny Pino as Junior Detective Nick Amaro
 Kelli Giddish as Junior Detective Amanda Rollins
 Richard Belzer as Senior Detective Sergeant John Munch
 Ice-T as Senior Detective Odafin "Fin" Tutuola
 Dann Florek as Captain Donald "Don" Cragen

Special guest stars
 BD Wong as FBI Special Agent Dr. George Huang
 Dean Winters as Detective Brian Cassidy
 Tamara Tunie as Medical Examiner Dr. Melinda Warner
 Stephanie March as Assistant District Attorney Alexandra Cabot
 Diane Neal as Assistant District Attorney Casey Novak

Crossover stars
 Linus Roache as Bureau Chief Assistant District Attorney Mike Cutter (Crossing over with Law & Order)

Recurring cast

 Laura Benanti as Maria Grazie Amaro
 Harry Connick Jr. as Executive Assistant District Attorney David Haden
 Tabitha Holbert as Assistant District Attorney Rose Callier
 Andre Braugher as Defense Attorney Bayard Ellis
 Ron Rifkin as Defense Attorney Marvin Exley
 Allison Fernandez as Zara Amaro
 David Pittu as Defense Attorney Linus Tate
 Ami Brabson as Judge Blake
 Michael Mastro as Judge D. Serani
 Jenna Stern as Judge Elana Barth
 Jacqueline Hendy as Defense Attorney Crane
 Gilbert Gottfried as Technical Assistance Response Unit Technician Leo Gerber
 Gretchen Egolf as Defense Attorney Kendra Gill
 Dominic Fumusa as Jason Harris
 Karen Tsen Lee as Medical Examiner Susan Chung
 Karen Young as Dr. Meg Whitmere
 Stephen C. Bradbury as Judge Colin McNamara
 Steve Rosen as Defense Attorney Michael Guthrie
 Betsy Aidem as Dr Sloane
 Max Baker as Colin Bennett
 Charlie Tahan as Calvin Arliss
 Scott William Winters as Detective Robert Dumas

Guest stars

Linus Roache reprised his role of ADA Michael Cutter from the original Law & Order series in the season premiere episode. Cutter has been promoted at the DA's office to Bureau Chief ADA in which he oversees the ADAs assigned to the Special Victims Unit. Show runner Warren Leight stated, "If Cutter was a bit of a hot head in the past, the passage of time and some added responsibility in his new job has made him more mature, and perhaps a bit more jaded." Roache had to say, "I learned a lot from my time on Law & Order and it's going to be interesting to experiment with Cutter's development in this new context — I think Special Victims is going to be an area where Cutter's passion for justice can really come forth." Franco Nero guest starred in the season premiere episode as an Italian dignitary accused of rape, evoking the Dominique Strauss-Kahn arrest. Kathleen Garrett played the Italian dignitary's "stand-by-your-man" wife, Ron Rifkin played his savvy defense lawyer, similar to Strauss-Kahn's real-life lawyer, Benjamin Brafman, and Broadway and Dreamgirls star Anika Noni Rose played the victim. NBA stars Carmelo Anthony (New York Knicks) and Chris Bosh (Miami Heat) played themselves in cameo guest appearances in the episode "Personal Fouls". Mehcad Brooks played Prince Miller, a fictional basketball superstar who was once one of the coach's prodigies. Rapper/actor Heavy D played Miller's cousin and business manager, Supreme. Anthony and Bosh appeared in the opening scene and episode climax.

Kyle MacLachlan guest starred in the episode "Blood Brothers" as Andrew Raines, a charming, seductive Master of the Universe-esque philanthropist in his 50s who is part of one of New York's royal families; he is a powerful politician whose family is embroiled in a scandal. Paige Turco portrayed Andrew's (MacLachlan's) wife Kathleen, who is described as "charming, charismatic and fiercely protective of her family". MacLachlan and Turco have appeared on SVU before; MacLachlan in the season 6 episode "Conscience" as Dr. Brett Morton, a psychiatrist who was acquitted of murder for the sake of avenging his son's death. Turco was in the third season episode "Ridicule" as a woman named Pam Adler who aided in gang raping a male stripper. The episode was inspired by the infidelity and divorce of Arnold Schwarzenegger. T.R. Knight guest starred as a suspected serial rapist who consistently maintains his innocence despite overwhelming evidence. Charlie Tahan made an appearance following news that Season 13 would feature a return of Calvin Arliss, Olivia's foster child for two episodes in Season 12. In "Missing Pieces", Arliss is seen with Olivia and his elder foster family, presumably his grandparents from Vermont to whom he was sent to live with by his mother.

Andre Braugher portrayed Bayard Ellis on a recurring basis. Ellis is a high-powered defense attorney for the underprivileged who becomes a civil rights champion, as well as a close friend to Detective Olivia Benson (Mariska Hargitay). Braugher guest starred in a sixth-season episode of the original Law & Order series as Frank Pembleton, who originally worked in the Baltimore City Police Department's Homicide Squad with Detective John Munch (Richard Belzer) on Homicide: Life on the Street. New showrunner Warren Leight stated about the addition of Ellis, "I want the squad room and the legal team to have worthy adversaries, not to have straw men that they can easily take down, he's really smart, a very successful defense attorney who, in an effort to expiate his guilt, has started to defend those black and Latino youths who don't get good defense in New York. He sees an encroaching world of police and district attorney's office tyranny, and he's out to subvert it or to try to get the playing field back to where it was before 9/11." Sofia Vassilieva guest starred in the same episode in which Braugher debuted. Vassilieva portrayed Sarah Walsh, a self-reliant, bohemian girl and shining star of her middle-class suburban family who comes to New York City on a piano scholarship, and loses her inner light after she is attacked in her own apartment.

Timothy Busfield and Izabella Miko guest starred in "Russian Brides". Busfield played a widower whose fiancée (played by Miko) mysteriously disappears. Natasha Lyonne and Carrie Preston guest starred in the episode "Educated Guess". Lyonne played Gia, a patient at a psychiatric hospital, while Preston played her aunt. The hospital becomes a point of interest for SVU detectives due to a possible rape case. Comedian Gilbert Gottfried guest starred in the episode "Lost Traveler". Executive producer Warren Leight explained he was looking for a colorful character to take the snooze factor away from a new under-appreciated technical IT character in the precinct. "Those scenes can be dry, so I thought he'd be interesting." Warren said he would be bringing back the character, Leo Gerber, "from time to time."

Laura Benanti guest starred as Detective Nick Amaro's wife, Maria, who returns from overseas. She and Amaro must figure out where their relationship stands. Benanti first appeared in "Spiraling Down" and has the potential of a multi-episode arc. Treat Williams guest starred in the episode "Spiraling Down", in which he played Jake Stanton, a former all-star quarterback caught up in a sting operation with an underage prostitute. Stanton is represented by famed defense attorney Bayard Ellis (Andre Braugher). Beth Chamberlin guest starred as Georgia Stanton, the wife of Treat Williams' Jake Stanton. Real-life football pros Jerry Rice and Warren Sapp also made special appearances.

Kevin Pollak guest starred in the episode "Theatre Tricks", playing a judge who finds himself on the wrong side of the law. Pollak tweeted on December 2, 2011; "Big ass props to the crew and cast of Law & Order: SVU for making my first day of shooting super easy and nutty fun." Ice-T's wife, Coco Austin briefly guest starred in "Theatre Tricks" as an actress at a theater, staging a show in the vein of the popular live show Sleep No More, where the audience becomes part of the show. Coco's character played Venus, the goddess of love, Coco at one point gets very personal with another actress in the play. This episode marked Coco Austin's third appearance in Law & Order: SVU. Fisher Stevens played Ted Scott in "Theatre Tricks". Scott is involved in a Special Victims Unit investigation when an actress' sexual assault is mistaken for a performance by a theater audience. "He's a very lonely man. You'd never know it because he's always surrounded by beautiful woman," Stevens says. "He preys on his students a bit. His ego is a bit out of whack." In one of his first TV guest starring roles, Adam Driver plays Jason Roberts in this episode. His character is a suspect, but was eventually ruled out. Holt McCallany guest-starred in the episode "Official Story" marking his third time working with show runner Warren Leight, who was the showrunner of the short-lived FX series Lights Out. McCallany also guest starred in the seventh-season premiere episode of Law & Order: Criminal Intent, at the time Leight was show runner of it as well.

On January 6, 2012, NBC president Robert Greenblatt announced at the Television Critics Association winter press tour that Harry Connick, Jr. had been cast in a four-episode arc as new Executive ADA, David Haden, a dedicated, straight-shooting prosecutor who is assigned a case with Detective Benson (Mariska Hargitay). Although Benson is at first wary of Haden, they are both surprised to find they work well together. As the case develops, so does their relationship. Connick's first episode was "Official Story", which aired January 18. "This is a home run on so many levels," said Mariska. "The show is very fortunate to have Harry's extraordinary talent, and I'm lucky because I get to work with my friend. I think Olivia couldn't have asked for a better companion to take her through a new stage in her life and career."

Country singer Miranda Lambert made her acting debut on the Law & Order: Special Victims Unit episode "Father's Shadow". Lambert played an actress who claims to have been sexually assaulted by a reality show producer played by Michael McKean. Harry Connick, Jr. (EADA David Haden) appeared in the episode as well. Ilene Kristen guest starred in "Father's Shadow" playing Evelyn Higgins, the estranged wife of Fred Sandow (Michael McKean). Kristen reported, "I had fun. I got to work with Ice-T, Mariska Hargitay, Kelli Giddish, and my old friend Dann Florek. We were on location; it was supposed to be the Lower East Side, but it was in Brooklyn in Williamsburg. It was a good experience, though it is hard shooting outside in the middle of winter. You get spoiled shooting a soap because you are inside most of the time." Cameron Monaghan guest starred as Sandow's disturbed teenage son and his producer.

Jake T. Austin guest starred in an episode titled "Home Invasions," Austin played Rob Fisher, the boyfriend of a girl whose family is massacred. "It's an honor to be a part of such a respected series," Austin said in a statement to The Huffington Post. "Being a New Yorker myself, I'm a huge fan of the show and can't wait to start filming." Tommy Flanagan also appeared in "Home Invasions" as a bookie and Isiah Whitlock also played a part in the episode. Michael Weston returned to the show to portray Olivia's brother, Simon Marsden. Simon was faced with losing his child in a battle with child social services. Andre Braugher also guest starred in the episode as Bayard Ellis.

Mark Consuelos guest starred as a potential suspect in the episode "Justice Denied". Danny Pino stated to TV Guide about the episode's case, "The case we're about to work on is one that deals with Fleet Week, and sailors that may or may not be responsible for a rape," Pino reveals. "Amaro starts to realize that maybe the original attacker wasn't really guilty. He starts to look at the new evidence and starts to question [the original investigation]." Chloë Sevigny guest starred in the episode "Valentine's Day", as a stay-at-home mom who is attacked and kidnapped while video-chatting with her husband, who is halfway around the world. She was slated to start shooting the episode the week of February 20, 2012. NBC declined to comment on the casting.

James Van Der Beek guest starred as a former friend of a doctor who is sabotaging him in the episode titled "Father Dearest," "I'm [going to] do some more serious drama this year," Van Der Beek recently told TVGuide.com. "I love that process. That's what I grew up doing, so sinking my teeth into a meaty role is definitely on the agenda."

Martha Stewart guest starred in the episode "Learning Curve" as a private school's headmistress. Tony Hale and Jane Adams also guest starred in the episode. Hale played Rick Simms, a teacher who is fired from his job after being accused of inappropriate behavior with a student (Dylan Minnette); Adams played Simms' former supervisor. Stewart said about her role as "the headmistress of a girls' school who is defending one of her teachers, a suspect in some hideous crime," she said. The gig hit close to home. "It was frightening work because the women detectives were very threatening. It brought back bad memories!" Constantine Maroulis guest starred in the episode "Strange Beauty".

In the season finale episode, titled "Rhodium Nights", Dean Winters returned to the show as Detective Brian Cassidy, who is running security for the owner of an escort service named Bart Ganzel, who is portrayed by Peter Jacobson. Brooke Smith played Ganzel’s rival in the sex-for-hire biz, Pippa Black portrayed a call girl, and Eric Ladin a well-known news anchor who is hosting the party where the body turns up. Show runner/executive producer Warren Leight noted that he booked the guest stars to be in the season 14 premiere episode, which turned out to be a two-part episode itself. "In fact, there were a number of scenes we shot that didn't make it into this cut that may make it into the next one. ... It's good to know who did it and why, and who's pulling the strings. I don't think we have every beat plotted out, and we may even do a two-parter to open the season. That's still in discussion. We have booked many of the actors so they're available when we begin shooting again in July. So just on that basis, we had to know who was complicit, because we had to know who was coming back." He also confirmed Dean Winters would return as well, "He's a terrific actor. ... Olivia has that line that Cassidy used to work in SVU "last century," and that's true. The show has legs. But I thought he had a lot of swag to him—I was very impressed. I thought the tension between Cassidy and Amaro was very believable."

Episodes

References

External links
 Law & Order: Special Victims Unit Season 13 at TVGuide.com
 Law & Order: Special Victims Unit Season 13 - TV IV
 Season 13 episodes at IMDb.com

13
2011 American television seasons
2012 American television seasons